Beth Fantaskey is an American author of children's and young adult fiction.

She attended Shippensburg where she earned an English degree. She has a Ph.D. in media history from Penn State. She worked as a speechwriter after college and then became a journalist.

Her debut novel, Jessica's Guide to Dating on the Dark Side, sold over 45,000 copies in its first few months of publication.

She lives in Lewisburg, Pennsylvania. She teaches at Susquehanna University.

Reception 
Jessica's Guide to Dating on the Dark Side and Buzz Kill received starred reviews from Publishers Weekly.

Selected works 

 Jessica's Guide to Dating on the Dark Side. Harcourt, 2009. 
 Jekel Loves Hyde. Harcourt, 2010. 
 Jessica Rules the Dark Side. Harcourt, 2012. 
 Buzz Kill. HMH Books, 2014. 
 Isabel Feeney, Star Reporter. HMH Books, 2016.

References

External links 

 Official website
 Practically Paradise blog at School Library Journal

American children's writers
American writers
Living people
1965 births
Pennsylvania State University alumni
Shippensburg University of Pennsylvania alumni
Susquehanna University faculty